Mount Harvey is a snow-free peak east of Amundsen Bay, standing in the Tula Mountains of Antarctica, about  east-northeast of Mount Gleadell. It was sighted in 1955 by an Australian National Antarctic Research Expeditions party led by P.W. Crohn, and was named by the Antarctic Names Committee of Australia for William Harvey, a carpenter at Mawson Station in 1954.

External links 

 Mount Harvey on USGS website 
 Mount Harvey on AADC website 
 Mount Harvey on SCAR website

References 

Mountains of Enderby Land